Eumicrotremus awae is a species of lumpfish endemic to the Pacific coast of Honshu, Japan, where it may be found from Chiba to Mie. It is a very small fish, reaching a maximum of 2 cm (0.8 in) SL, and it occurs near shore at depths of less than 20 m (66 ft). This species is variable in color, being typically seen as either vibrant green or red. It is known to feed on extremely small crabs, and was previously known as Lethotremus awae until it was reclassified in 2017 following a taxonomic review and the descriptions of two similar "dwarf" species in Eumicrotremus.

References 

Fish of Japan
awae
Taxa named by David Starr Jordan
Taxa named by John Otterbein Snyder